The Ambassador Extraordinary and Plenipotentiary of the Russian Federation to the Republic of Albania is the official representative of the President and the Government of the Russian Federation to the President and the Government of Albania.

The ambassador and his staff work at large in the Embassy of Russia in Tirana.

History of diplomatic relations

Attempts to establish diplomatic relations at the mission level between the Soviet Union and Albania began after the June Revolution in 1924 under the auspices of the Soviet ambassador to Greece  . Krakovetsky arrived in Tirana on 16 December 1924, but events overtook him when the Albanian government fell to armed forces that placed Ahmed Bey Zogu in power as president of the Albanian Republic. Relations were finally established in September 1934, with the ambassador to Greece serving as non-resident representative to Albania, but were broken off in April 1939 after the Italian invasion and occupation of Albania.

Diplomatic relations were resumed after the war, with the Soviet government recognising the Democratic Government of Albania on 10 November 1945, which after 1946 became the People's Socialist Republic of Albania. The first Soviet envoy, presented his credentials on 11 January 1946. After a period of relatively strong relations, disagreements between the Albanian and Soviet governments caused relations to deteriorate sharply in the late 1950s and early 1960s. The Soviets withdrew their embassy in November 1961, and officially suspended diplomatic relations the following month. Relations were only restored after a joint meeting in June-July 1990 between the Soviet and Albanian foreign ministries. The Soviet embassy in Tirana was reopened in February 1991, while the Albanian embassy in Moscow opened in April 1991. With the dissolution of the Soviet Union in 1991, the Soviet ambassador, continued as representative of the Russian Federation until 1996.

List of representatives (1924 – present)

Representatives of the Soviet Union to Albania (1924 – 1991)

Representatives of the Russian Federation to Albania (1991 – present)

References

 
Albania
Russia